This article is about the particular significance of the year 1844 to Wales and its people.

Incumbents

Lord Lieutenant of Anglesey – Henry Paget, 1st Marquess of Anglesey 
Lord Lieutenant of Brecknockshire – Penry Williams
Lord Lieutenant of Caernarvonshire – Peter Drummond-Burrell, 22nd Baron Willoughby de Eresby 
Lord Lieutenant of Cardiganshire – William Edward Powell
Lord Lieutenant of Carmarthenshire – George Rice, 3rd Baron Dynevor 
Lord Lieutenant of Denbighshire – Robert Myddelton Biddulph   
Lord Lieutenant of Flintshire – Robert Grosvenor, 1st Marquess of Westminster 
Lord Lieutenant of Glamorgan – John Crichton-Stuart, 2nd Marquess of Bute 
Lord Lieutenant of Merionethshire – Edward Lloyd-Mostyn, 2nd Baron Mostyn
Lord Lieutenant of Monmouthshire – Capel Hanbury Leigh
Lord Lieutenant of Montgomeryshire – Edward Herbert, 2nd Earl of Powis
Lord Lieutenant of Pembrokeshire – Sir John Owen, 1st Baronet
Lord Lieutenant of Radnorshire – John Walsh, 1st Baron Ormathwaite

Bishop of Bangor – Christopher Bethell 
Bishop of Llandaff – Edward Copleston 
Bishop of St Asaph – William Carey 
Bishop of St Davids – Connop Thirlwall

Events
1 January - 11 or 12 men are killed in a mining accident at Dinas Middle Colliery, Rhondda.
14 February - 40 men are killed by flooding at Garden Pit coal-mine at Landshipping, Pembrokeshire.
8 March - John Jones (Shoni Sguborfawr) embarks on the Blundell for transportation to Norfolk Island, his sentence for shooting at a man during the Rebecca Riots.
13 May - 7 or 8 men are killed in a mining accident at Broadmoor, Loveston, Pembrokeshire.
3 December - 6 men are killed in a mining accident at Fforest Level, Dinas, Rhondda.
31 December - David Williams takes out a lease on a mine at Cwmbach, in partnership with Lewis Lewis (of Cefn Coed.
date unknown
A prospectus is issued to potential investors in a railway to be built through south Wales from a junction with the Great Western Railway at Standish in Gloucestershire.
Owen Owen Roberts is instrumental in setting up the first hospital for Caernarvonshire and Anglesey, at Bangor.

Arts and literature

New books
Hugh Derfel Hughes - Blodau'r Gân
David Owen (Brutus) - Eliasia

Music
Rowland Prichard - Cyfaill y Cantorion (The Singer's Friend)
Maria Jane Williams - Ancient National Airs of Gwent and Morgannwg

Visual arts
English watercolour landscape painter David Cox spends his first summer at Betws-y-Coed, which he will continue to do until 1856.

Sport
Denbigh Cricket Club is founded.

Births
1 January - Robert Clayton, cricketer (died 1901)
7 March - Watkin Hezekiah Williams, poet and schoolmaster (died 1905)
28 April - Thomas Jones (Tudno), poet (died 1895)
June - John Roland Phillips, historian (died 1887)
28 July - Gerard Manley Hopkins, Welsh-descended poet (died 1889)
3 August - Herbert Armitage James, clergyman and schoolmaster (died 1931)
1 December - Alexandra of Denmark, Princess of Wales 1901-1910 (died 1925)

Deaths
18 January - Azariah Shadrach, minister and author, 69
7 April - Morgan Lewis, Welsh-descended American politician, 89
8 November - Iltid Nicholl, lawyer, 67/68
23 November - Thomas William, hymn-writer, 83

References

Wales